Björn Höcke (born 1 April 1972) is a  German politician and a member of Alternative for Germany (AfD). Along with Andreas Kalbitz, Höcke is the leader of the AfD's far-right "Der Flügel" faction, which the German government's Federal Office for the Protection of the Constitution declared a right-wing extremist organization.

Early life and education
Björn Höcke was born in Lünen, Westphalia. His grandparents were expelled Germans from East Prussia. He took his Abitur at the Rhein-Wied-Gymnasium, Neuwied, in 1991.

Höcke is a former history teacher, teaching at the Rhenanus School, a comprehensive school in Bad Sooden-Allendorf.

Political career

Höcke was a short-time member of the Junge Union.

As one of the founders of AfD Thuringia, he became Member of the Landtag of Thuringia, the state assembly of the federal state of Thuringia in Germany during the 2014 Thuringian State Elections. Höcke is the speaker of the parliamentary group of the AfD and he is the spokesman of the Thuringia Landesverband (English: Regional Association) of his party.  He is said to be part of the "national-conservative wing" of the AfD. His faction of the party is known as the Flügel (the Wing) and 40 percent of the AfD party members identify themselves with it.

In September 2019, Höcke threatened "massive consequences" to a ZDF journalist who refused to restart an interview after a series of difficult questions and after asking fellow party members whether various quotes are from his book or from Hitler's Mein Kampf.

During the 2019 Thuringian state election, The AFD under the leadership of Höcke more than doubled its vote share to 23%, overtaking the opposition Christian Democratic Union (CDU) to place second.

In November 2021, Höcke's parliamentary immunity in the Landtag of Thuringia was cancelled. He was accused to have ended a speech in May with a phrase used by the SA whose use is illegal under insignia legislation.

Political views 
Höcke espouses far-right views.  Political scientists such as Gero Neugebauer and Hajo Funke have commented that Höcke's opinions are close to the National Democratic Party of Germany and consider his statements völkisch, racist and fascist. In September 2019, a German court ruled that Höcke could legally be called a fascist as the description "rests on verifiable fact".

Immigration policy 
Regarding the European migrant crisis, Höcke opposes Germany's asylum policy, leading regular demonstrations in Erfurt against the federal government's asylum policy, which regularly attracted several thousand sympathizers. He opposes the euro, favoring a return to national currencies.

He is reported to have declared that if Europe would keep on taking in immigrants, the African "reproductive behavior" will not change. In 2017, Höcke stated "dear young African men: for you there is no future and no home in Germany and in Europe!"

Family policy 
Höcke has called for more "Prussian virtues" and promotes natalist views, specifically the "three-child family as a political and social model." He opposes gender mainstreaming and demands an end of what he calls "social experiments" that undermine what he deems the "natural gender order."

Education policy 
He opposes the mainstreaming of students with disabilities, calling for such students to go the separate schools, and opposes school sexual education, which he regards as "early sexualization of the students," and wants to "stop the dissolution of the natural polarity of the two sexes".

Controversies

Ties to Neo-Nazis 
Höcke has links with neo-Nazi circles in Germany. Höcke has written with Thorsten Heise, a leader of NPD. In 2015 Höcke was accused of having contributed to Heise's journal People in Motion (Volk in Bewegung) and The Reichsbote under a pseudonym ("Landolf Ladig"). Höcke denied having ever written for NPD papers, but refused to give a statutory declaration as demanded by the AfD Federal Executive Board.

In a 2014 email to party colleagues, Höcke advocated the abolition of section 86 of the German Criminal Code (which prohibits the spread of propaganda by unconstitutional organizations) and section 130 of the German Criminal Code (which criminalizes incitement to hatred towards other groups). This would also have legalized Holocaust denial, which is illegal in Germany.

Allegations of antisemitism 

Höcke gave a speech in Dresden in January 2017, in which, referring to the Holocaust memorial in Berlin (the Memorial to the Murdered Jews of Europe), he stated that "we Germans are the only people in the world who have planted a memorial of shame in the heart of their capital" and suggested that Germans "need to make a 180 degree change in their commemoration policy".

The speech was widely criticized as antisemitic, among others by Jewish leaders in Germany, and he was described by his party chairwoman, Frauke Petry, in response as a "burden to the party". As a result of his speech, the majority of leaders of the AfD asked in February 2017 that Björn Höcke be expelled from the party. In May 2018 an AfD tribunal ruled that Höcke was allowed to stay in the party.

After Höcke's "monument of shame" comment, the Center for Political Beauty, a Berlin-based art collective, erected a full-scale replica of one section of the Holocaust memorial in Berlin within viewing distance of Höcke's home in Bornhagen as a reminder of German history.

In an interview with the Wall Street Journal Höcke criticized that:"Hitler was regarded as only bad".
According to a newspaper and n-tv a German version of channel news network, he said that quote: "It was not all bad under Hitler".

A video of Höcke emerged in March 2020 in which he used an Auschwitz pun while attacking critics of his Flügel faction. The faction had been placed under surveillance by the Federal Office for the Protection of the Constitution shortly before the video surfaced.

References

External links 

 Official website
 Official Thüringer Landtag profile

1972 births
Alternative for Germany politicians
Living people
Members of the Landtag of Thuringia
People from Lünen
21st-century German politicians
German fascists
Politicians affected by a party expulsion process